Johnny O Driscoll is a footballer from Camp, County Kerry. He played with the Kerry intercounty team during the 1990s. He also played with the New York team in the 2000s.

Club

He played his club football with Annascaul, helping them to the 1993 County Final where they lost out to Laune Rangers. He won Intermediate titles in 1992 and 2007 and a Junior title in 2003. He also won a Minor title with West Kerry in 1990. He won a New York Senior Football Championship in 1999.

Minor

O'Driscoll first played with Kerry at minor level in the 1990 All-Ireland Minor Football Championship. Wins over Tipperary, Clare and Cork seen him win a Munster Minor Football Championship. Kerry needed a replay to over come Galway in the All-Ireland semi-final. In the final Kerry faced Meath in Croke Park. In a close game the title went to Meath on a 2-11 to 2-09 scoreline.

References

 https://web.archive.org/web/20090619122113/http://munster.gaa.ie/winning-teams/u21f_teams/
 http://munster.gaa.ie/winning-teams/sf_teams/
 https://web.archive.org/web/20091219221445/http://munster.gaa.ie/winning-teams/ifclub_teams/

Year of birth missing (living people)
Living people
Annascaul Gaelic footballers
Kerry inter-county Gaelic footballers
New York Gaelic footballers